David Farrance (born June 23, 1999) is an American professional ice hockey defenseman for the Colorado Eagles in the American Hockey League (AHL). Farrance was selected by the Nashville Predators in the third-round, 92nd overall, of the 2017 NHL Entry Draft.

Early life
Farrance was born on June 23, 1999, in Victor, New York, U.S. to parents Pam and David Farrance. He is the middle child with one older sister, Sydney Farrance and one younger sister, Julia Farrance . Farrance grew up playing baseball but was ultimately drawn to ice hockey because of its speed and action. He worked on his skating ability alongside his friend Jake Tortora with a power-skating instructor at Paul Louis Arena.

Playing career

Amateur
Farrance chose to play high school hockey with the Victor Blue Devils high school team in 2014 while practicing with the Syracuse Nationals 16-under AAA team twice a week. During the 2013–14 season, Farrance was the Syracuse Stars U-16's leading scorer with 20 goals and 12 assists for 32 in 28 United States Premier Hockey League (USPHL) games. He also played for Victor in the Section V high school league, gathering 46 points in 21 games. While playing for the Syracuse Stars U-16 team as a sophomore in high school, Farrance made a verbal commitment to join Boston University for his freshman season in 2017–18. By making the commitment, he announced his decision to forgo his Ontario Hockey League (OHL) eligibility.

As a sophomore, Farrance split the 2014–15 season with the Blue Devils in the Monroe County league and the Syracuse Stars U-16. He was named USPHL MVP and Defenseman of the Year after accumulating up 52 points for the Stars and also was a first-team All-State selection with Victor. Due to his offensive success, Farrance accepted an invitation to play for USA Hockey National Team Development Program (USNTDP).  Farrance played two seasons with the USNTDP in the United States Hockey League (USHL) before joining Boston University. During the 2016–17 USHL season, Farrance recorded 37 points in 64 games and helped Team USA earn a gold medal at 2017 IIHF World U18 Championships.

Following the conclusion of his USHL career, Farrance was selected 92nd overall by the Nashville Predators in the 2017 NHL Entry Draft. Leading up to the draft, Farrance was ranked 46th amongst all North American skaters by the NHL Central Scouting Bureau.

Collegiate
Farrance played four seasons for the Boston University Terriers at Boston University while enrolled in the Boston University College of Arts and Sciences, majoring in psychology. During his rookie season, Farrance played in 31 games where he recorded three goals and six assists. He made his NCAA tournament debut on March 24, 2018, where he scored the game-winning goal against Cornell University. As a result, he was named to the NCAA Northeast Regional All-Tournament Team. The Terriers were eventually eliminated in the following round against Michigan. As a sophomore, Farrance picked up offensively and tied for fifth on the team in points with 20 on four goals and 16 assists.

During his junior season, Farrance led all NCAA defensemen in scoring, recording 43 points across 35 games. Following the season, he was selected to the Hockey East First All-Star Team and was named one of the finalists for the Hobey Baker Award.

Professional
On March 28, 2021, having completed his four-year collegiate career, Farrance was signed a two-year, entry-level contract with the Nashville Predators. Upon joining the Predators organization, Farrance was assigned to their taxi squad. He eventually made his NHL debut on April 8, 2021, against the Detroit Red Wings, where he logged 12:46 of ice time with one shot, one hit, one blocked shot and a plus-1 rating.

At the conclusion of his entry-level contract and as an impending restricted free agent, Farrance was not tendered a qualifying offer by the Predators and was released to free agency. On July 26, 2022, Farrance continued his tenure in the AHL, agreeing to a one-year contract with the Chicago Wolves, primary affiliate to the Carolina Hurricanes, for the 2022–23 season. Farrance got off to a positive start with the Wolves, registering 1 goal and 5 points through 14 games from the blueline. 

On December 2, 2022, Farrance was traded by the Wolves to the Colorado Eagles, primary affiliate of the Colorado Avalanche, in exchange for future considerations.

Career statistics

Regular season and playoffs

International

Awards and honors

References

External links
 

1999 births
American men's ice hockey defensemen
Boston University Terriers men's ice hockey players
Chicago Wolves players
Colorado Eagles players
Ice hockey players from New York (state)
Living people
Milwaukee Admirals players
Nashville Predators draft picks
Nashville Predators players
People from Victor, New York
Sportspeople from Rochester, New York
USA Hockey National Team Development Program players
AHCA Division I men's ice hockey All-Americans